The men's high jump event at the 1999 European Athletics U23 Championships was held in Göteborg, Sweden, at Ullevi on 29 and 31 July 1999.

Medalists

Results

Final
31 July

Qualifications
29 July
Qualifying 2.22 or 12 best to the Final

Group A

Group B

Participation
According to an unofficial count, 20 athletes from 14 countries participated in the event.

 (3)
 (1)
 (1)
 (1)
 (1)
 (1)
 (2)
 (1)
 (1)
 (3)
 (1)
 (2)
 (1)
 (1)

References

High jump
High jump at the European Athletics U23 Championships